The Women's team pursuit event of the 2015 UCI Track Cycling World Championships was held on 18–19 February 2015.

Results

Qualifying
The qualifying was held at 14:45.

First round
The first round was held at 16:00.

Finals
The finals were started at 20:20.

References

Women's team pursuit
UCI Track Cycling World Championships – Women's team pursuit